María Joselina García Cobos (born October 31, 1978, in Tegucigalpa, Honduras) is a Latin American beauty queen. Business administrator at University of San Pedro Sula and MBA at Universidad Catolica, Honduras. She won Miss Honduras in 1997 contest and competed in Miss Universe the same year. There she placed second in the Best National Costume Award, just after COLOMBIA - Claudia Vásquez Ángel. Her costume was designed by the Colombian designer Alfredo Rueda.
 
She spent her first years in Florida, U.S., but then moved back to Honduras. Married in June 2004 in San Pedro Sula, Honduras with Federico Arrambides, Mexican CPA & MBA. Follow her husband and move into San Salvador, El Salvador in October 2009. Just after President Zelaya was kicked out of the country and coup started. In November 2013 she moved with her family into Mexico City.

She is the mother of two children. Monserrat Arrambides (January 8, 2008) and Andres Arrambides (March 18, 2011).

References 

1978 births
Honduran beauty pageant winners
Living people
Miss Universe 1997 contestants